Adaina fuscahodias is a moth of the family Pterophoridae. It is found in Mexico (Veracruz), Brazil and Costa Rica.

The head is scaled and pale ochreous-white. The antennae are pale ochreous-white, with a faint brownish gloss. The thorax, tegulae, mesothorax and abdomen are pale ochreous-white. The forewings are pale ochreous-white, diffusely mixed with pale brown scales. The markings are pale brown. The underside is brownish, without markings. The hindwings and fringes are brown-grey and the underside is brownish. Adults have been recorded in February, July, August and December.

The larvae feed on Verbesina species, Senecio brasiliensis and Vernonanthura mariana.

Etymology
The name refers to the close resemblance in genitalia with Adaina hodias and the striking darker area on the forewing.

References

Moths described in 1992
Oidaematophorini